Symphony No. 3, also known as Symphony No. 3 "The Sunday Symphony", is a 1958 composition in four movements by American composer William Grant Still. The work was first performed on February 12, 1984 by the North Arkansas Symphony Orchestra conducted by Carlton Woodsi. The symphony is about eighteen minutes long.

Overview
Symphony No. 3 is a programmatic work that depicts the Sunday life of “a devout worshipper”. Composed in four movements, "with titles suggesting the activities carried out on a typical Sunday, from waking up to the end of the day. A joyous first movement as an optimistic start to the holiday, followed by prayer. After a relaxed dance the day ends happily waiting for the new day." Overall, the music expresses the composer's religious beliefs, "each day being a new opportunity to serve the creator".

Movements
The symphony is in four movements as follows:

See also
 List of jazz-influenced classical compositions

References

Further reading

External links
 

Compositions by William Grant Still
1958 compositions
Still